Events from the year 1819 in Ireland.

Events
9 April – 7 June: Select Committee of the House of Commons inquires into the state of disease and condition of the poor in Ireland. Typhus epidemic continues.
3 May – Henry Grattan petitions the House of Commons of the United Kingdom in favour of Catholic Emancipation.
26 June – first detachment of John Devereux's Irish Legion sets sail from Liverpool in the Charlotte Gambier to aid Simón Bolívar in his campaign to liberate New Granada in South America.
13/14 July – uxoricide of Ellen Scanlan (née Hanley, the "Colleen Bawn") and dumping of her body in the River Shannon.
c. October – disturbances by supporters of Ribbonism.

Arts and literature
16 April – the Belfast Harp Society is reconstituted as the Irish Harp Society.
Publication of William Parnell's Maurice and Berghetta, or, the priest of Rahery: a tale anonymously in London.

Births
January – William Travers, lawyer, politician, explorer, and naturalist in New Zealand (died 1903).
31 January – William Pakenham, 4th Earl of Longford, soldier and politician (died 1887).
1 March – Mother Vincent Whitty, nun (died 1892).
30 March – Bartholomew Woodlock, Roman Catholic Bishop of Ardagh (died 1902).
31 March – Edward Selby Smyth, British General, commanded Militia of Canada from 1874 to 1880 (died 1896).
1 May – Jimmy Corcoran, emigrant to Manhattan (died 1900).
2 July – Edward Vaughan Hyde Kenealy, barrister and writer (died 1880).
5 July – Hedges Eyre Chatterton, Conservative Party MP and Vice-Chancellor of Ireland (died 1910).
8 July – Francis Leopold McClintock, Royal Navy officer, explorer in the Canadian Arctic Archipelago (died 1907).
25 July – John J. Conroy, bishop of the Roman Catholic Diocese of Albany (New York) (died 1895).
13 August – George Stokes, mathematician known for the creation of the Navier-Stokes equation (died 1903).
10 September – Joseph M. Scriven, poet, hymnodist and philanthropist (died 1886).
25 September – George Salmon, mathematician and theologian (died 1904).
28 December – Arthur Hunter Palmer, politician in Australia (died 1898).
Nicholas Joseph Crowley, portrait painter (died 1857).
Edwin Hayes, English-born marine watercolourist (died 1904).
Henry Wellesly McCann, farmer and politician in Canada.
Joseph Neale McKenna, banker and politician (died 1906).

Deaths

26 September – James Towers English, mercenary (born 1782).
27 November – Gustavus Conyngham, privateer (born c.1744/45).
10 December – Euseby Cleaver, Archbishop of Dublin (Church of Ireland) (born 1746).
Thomas Meredith, clergyman and mathematician (born 1777).
James O'Hara, military officer and businessman in the United States (born c.1752).

References

 
Years of the 19th century in Ireland
Ireland
 Ireland